The 1952 United States presidential election in New Hampshire took place on November 4, 1952, as part of the 1952 United States presidential election, which was held throughout all contemporary 48 states. Voters chose four representatives, or electors to the Electoral College, who voted for president and vice president.

New Hampshire was won by the Republican nominees, General Dwight D. Eisenhower of New York and his running mate Senator Richard Nixon of California. Eisenhower and Nixon defeated the Democratic nominees, former Governor Adlai Stevenson of Illinois and his running mate Senator John Sparkman of Alabama. 

Eisenhower took 60.92% of the vote to Stevenson's 39.08%, a margin of 21.84%.

Eisenhower, a war hero and moderate Republican who had pledged to maintain popular New Deal Democratic policies, had wide appeal beyond the boundaries of the traditional Republican coalition. New Hampshire had been narrowly carried by Democrat Franklin Roosevelt three out of four times, although the state narrowly reverted to the GOP in 1948. However Eisenhower's unique personal appeal brought the state decisively back into the Republican column in 1952.

Eisenhower won nine of the state's ten counties. 

Since Franklin Roosevelt won them in 1932, the counties of Hillsborough County, Strafford County, and Coos County had become reliable New Deal Democratic base counties, voting for Roosevelt all four times as well as for Harry S. Truman. However Eisenhower in 1952 won back Strafford County and Coos County for the GOP, although Stevenson won a majority in Hillsborough County, home to Manchester and Nashua, which had been a reliable Democratic bastion since voting for Democrat Al Smith in 1928. 

Carroll County had long been the most Republican county in New Hampshire, voting 60% against FDR all four times and over 70% for Thomas E. Dewey in 1948. Eisenhower would receive over 80% of vote in the county in 1952.

As Eisenhower won a decisive election victory nationally, New Hampshire's results would make the state almost 11% more Republican than the national average.

Results

Results by county

See also
 Presidency of Dwight D. Eisenhower
 United States presidential elections in New Hampshire

References

1952
New Hamp
1952 New Hampshire elections